Prunet may refer to the following places in France:

 Prunet, Ardèche, a commune in the department of Ardèche
 Prunet, Cantal, a commune in the department of Cantal
 Prunet, Haute-Garonne, a commune in the department of Haute-Garonne
 Prunet-et-Belpuig, a commune in the department of Pyrénées-Orientales
 La Salle-Prunet, a commune in the department of Lozère

and to:

Prunet, a village in Bratovoești Commune, Dolj County, Romania